Keiferia brunnea is a moth in the family Gelechiidae. It was described by Povolný in 1973. It is found on the Lesser Antilles.

References

Keiferia
Moths described in 1973
Taxa named by Dalibor Povolný